Darul Hadis Latifiah Northwest is an Islamic private school for 11 to 16-year-old boys in Oldham, Greater Manchester, England. It was established in 2012 by parents and community leaders.

See also 

 Badedeorail Fultali Kamil Madrasa
 Darul Hadis Latifiah

References

External links 
 

Islamic schools in England
Boys' schools in Greater Manchester
Private schools in the Metropolitan Borough of Oldham
Schools in Oldham